Queen Sirikit Naval Hospital is a hospital located in Sattahip District, Chonburi Province, Thailand. It is a military hospital operated by the Naval Medical Department, The Royal Thai Navy particularly for personnel of the Royal Thai Navy, but also for the general public. It has a CPIRD Medical Education Center which trains medical students for the Faculty of Medicine, Burapha University. It is an affiliated teaching hospital of Phramongkutklao College of Medicine.

History 
Queen Sirikit Naval Hospital was constructed following the increase in usage of the Abhakornkiatiwong Hospital of Sattahip Naval Base, the increase in naval personnel and the development of the nearby U-Tapao International Airport and  industrial areas such as Map Ta Phut. At the same time, this coincided with "The Celebrations on the Auspicious of Her Majesty the Queen's 5th Cycle Birthday Anniversary" and therefore Queen Sirikit came and laid the foundation of the hospital on 18 August 1992. The construction was completed on 20 November 1995.

See also 

Healthcare in Thailand
 Hospitals in Thailand
 List of hospitals in Thailand

References 

Hospitals in Thailand
Royal Thai Navy
Military hospitals in Thailand